The West Central Activities Conference is a high school athletic conference made up of 2A and 3A schools in Central Iowa. Currently there are 13 men's programs and 12 women's programs in the league.

Members

History
The current West Central Conference was formed in 1981 with eight members: Van Meter, Guthrie Center, Panora-Linden, Earlham, Martensdale-St. Mary's, Stuart-Menlo, Adair–Casey and Dexfield (Redfield). Prior to this time a different league known as the West Central Conference existed, but none of its members were founders of the new West Central Conference.

Throughout the 1980s, the league added Coon Rapids–Bayard and Nodaway Valley, and Panora-Linden began sharing with Y-J-B under the name Panorama. Dexfield and Stuart-Menlo also consolidated and left the league. In 1996, the league split in half as the four southernmost schools-along or south of Interstate 80-departed to conferences south and west: Martensdale-St. Mary's and Nodaway Valley to the Pride of Iowa and Earlham and Adair–Casey to the Rolling Hills Conference. The four remaining members brought in four new schools further north as replacements: Glidden–Ralston in Carroll County; East Greene (Grand Junction) and Paton-Churdan in Greene County; and Des Moines Christian in Urbandale in Polk County.  In an interesting twist, two of the newcomers (East Greene and Paton-Churdan) and a forerunner school to Panorama (YJB) were members of the original West Central.

In 2000, West Central Valley (the consolidated district of former members Dexfield and Stuart-Menlo) joined the league from the Raccoon River Conference, a conference with much larger schools. In 2004, Earlham rejoined the league as its tenth team. By 2007, many of the schools in the conference were starting to grow close to 2A in size, leading to Paton-Churdan leaving the conference for the smaller Rolling Hills Conference. Madrid joined the league at this time from the Heart of Iowa Conference. In 2009, Glidden–Ralston left for the Rolling Hills Conference, being replaced by Woodward-Granger, another Heart of Iowa Conference team. East Greene then opted to also leave the conference and join the Rolling Hills Conference, for 2011 with Ogden, yet another former Heart of Iowa Conference member (and a member of the original West Central Conference) replacing them. Woodward Academy also joined that year for boys' sports only from the rank of the Independents of Iowa High Schools.

Coon Rapids–Bayard left West Central for the new Rolling Valley Conference in the 2013–14 school year.

In the 2018–19 school year, Interstate 35 and Pleasantville joined the West Central Conference.  They made the move from the Pride of Iowa Conference, where I-35 was a founding member back in 1987.

References

High school sports in Iowa
Sports leagues established in 1981
1981 establishments in Iowa

Website
West Central Activities Conference